Stemonocera corruca is a species of tephritid (fruit flies) in the family Stemonocera.

References

Trypetinae